Marlon Ventura Rodrigues (born November 21, 1986, in Rio de Janeiro), or simply Marlon, is a Brazilian central defender. He currently plays for Treze.

Career
Marlon is create Estádio da Gávea. It started from small Flamengo and went through all the basic categories within the Rubro-Negro. The quarterback is the same generation of youth who do Flamengo won the Tricampeonato Carioca de Juniores in 2005, 2006 and 2007. Champion also Torneio Rio-São Paulo de juniores 2005 and Taça Otávio Pinto Guimarães in 2006.

The debut of the quarterback was exactly in 2006 when, under the command of Adílio, master of the base, and then acting in the first team, Marlon joined the B team Flamengo for the first two rounds of the Campeonato Estadual.

Then only 19 years old, the young quarterback liked, and still later that year, would have other opportunities among professionals in the second responded to the commands of Moacir Pereira, assistant Ney Franco. It is the first team play three days later, the Copa do Brasil replay against Vasco da Gama, and once again, Marlon starred in a mixed team.

Went on to play six more times in 2006, totaling eight games with no goals scored that season. Nevertheless, emerged as a promise to the team of 2007, however, the idea has not been met and after a few opportunities this season, was loaned to Ipatinga in 2008 where he also had many opportunities.

Even in the middle of 2008, considered not useful for the scheme Caio Júnior, who had a solid defense formed by Ronaldo Angelim and Fábio Luciano, Marlon was loaned to the Thrasyvoulos Fylis Greece, where he remained until 2009.

On his return will Estádio da Gávea, despite the retirement of Fábio Luciano, there have been few times in the name of Marlon mentioned, however, in the 13th round of the Brazilian Championship in 2009, due to the suspension of defenders Fabrício and Welinton, Marlon has just escalated to Grêmio Prudente face at the Estádio do Maracanã, and have a sober performance, it was not a penalty infant caused by a player who would eventually jeopardizing their morale with the biggest fans of Brazil.

In 2010 Marlon he was loaned to Duque de Caxias until the end of the 2011 state championship. In May 2011, Marlon has signed for Náutico until the end of 2011.

Marlon signed for Treze for in December 2020, for the 2021 season.

Career statistics
(Correct )

according to combined sources on the Flamengo official website and Flaestatística.

Honours

Club
 Flamengo
Youth
Campeonato Carioca Infantil: 2001
Campeonato Carioca de Juniores: 2005, 2006
Torneio Rio-São Paulo de Juniores: 2005
Taça Otávio Pinto Guimarães: 2006

Professional
Taça Guanabara: 2007
Rio de Janeiro State League: 2007
Brazilian Série A: 2009

National team
FIFA U-17 World Championship: 2003

Contract
 Duque de Caxias on loan from Flamengo.

References

External links
Player profile @ Flapédia 

soccerterminal 

1986 births
Living people
Brazilian footballers
Brazilian expatriate footballers
CR Flamengo footballers
Clube Náutico Capibaribe players
Duque de Caxias Futebol Clube players
Ceará Sporting Club players
Thrasyvoulos F.C. players
ABC Futebol Clube players
Sociedade Imperatriz de Desportos players
Esporte Clube Flamengo players
Central Sport Club players
Anápolis Futebol Clube players
Salgueiro Atlético Clube players
Joinville Esporte Clube players
Retrô Futebol Clube Brasil players
Rio Claro Futebol Clube players
Globo Futebol Clube players
Treze Futebol Clube players
Campeonato Brasileiro Série A players
Campeonato Brasileiro Série B players
Campeonato Brasileiro Série C players
Campeonato Brasileiro Série D players
Super League Greece players
Association football central defenders
Brazilian expatriate sportspeople in Greece
Expatriate footballers in Greece
Footballers from Rio de Janeiro (city)